Black Thorn is the fifth studio album by the Chicago celtic punk band Flatfoot 56. It was released as a part of the tenth anniversary of the band's founding to mostly positive reviews by critics.  The album, produced by Johnny Rioux, is the best selling Flatfoot 56 album so far entering the Billboard Heatseekers Chart at number two, after a week of sales.

Track listing

Reception

The album was received with mostly positive reviews from both the mainstream and the independent media. Several large media outlets including Alternative Press and HM reflected positively on the album. It was praised for its variety and maturity compared to Flatfoot 56's past albums. AMP noted that the album had a more mature sound than Flatfoot 56's past albums.  Several reviewers noted that the album was written with mosh pits in mind. However, the album was criticized for its more polished sound that broke away from the band's punk roots embracing a  more Dropkick Murphys like sound. Gavin McInnes has listed the album as one of the seven albums that changed his life saying, "I feel like these kids from the Southside of Chicago do the music of my adolescence even better than it was the first time around." McInnes also uses the song "Courage" in the intro and outro of his show on Compound Media.

Chart positions

Album

References

2010 albums
Flatfoot 56 albums